Cevdet Mehmet Kösemen (born 18 May 1984), also known by his former pen name Nemo Ramjet, is a Turkish researcher, artist, and author. Kosemen is known for his artwork, depicting living and extinct animals as well as surrealist scenes, and his writings on paleoart, speculative evolution, and history and culture in Turkey.

Together with Australian paleoartist John Conway and British paleontologist Darren Naish, Kosemen co-authored All Yesterdays, a 2012 book exploring speculative ideas in paleoart, and Cryptozoologicon, a book applying speculative evolution ideas to cryptids, both of which were widely covered in international media. Among Kosemen's most known personal speculative evolution projects are the book All Tomorrows (2006) and the ongoing project Snaiad.

Background 
Cevdet Mehmet Kösemen was born in Ankara, Turkey in 1984. After attending Koç High School (Istanbul) with obtaining an International Baccalaureate with high honours in 2002, he studied at Cornell University (New York) between 2002 and 2003, and at Sabancı University (Istanbul) between 2003 and 2007, where he obtained a Bachelor of Arts degree in Visual Arts and Communication Design. Kosemen subsequently went to Goldsmiths College (London) in 2007, from which he achieved a Master of Arts degree in Documentary Film and Media Studies in 2008. He has worked as an editor for the magazine Colors by Benetton and in several different advertising agencies.

From a young age, Kosemen was interested in paleontology, extinct animals and evolutionary history, envisioned by him as a way to explore "strange creatures and strange worlds". Kosemen is also interested in visual culture and Mediterranean history. His interests were encouraged by his parents and his grandfather, who on international trips bought him several books on animals. Among Kosemen's favorite literature growing up was the science fiction books of Olaf Stapledon, books on obscure cinema by Pete Tombs, and books part of the former Star Wars Expanded Universe. Kosemen learned English through textbooks on biology and zoology as well as through Star Wars books. Literature Kosemen has also cited as influential for him includes Larry Niven's Ringworld series, Arthur C. Clarke's science fiction works, and Jack L. Chalker's Well World series.

Career

Artwork 

Kosemen's artwork ranges from scientifically accurate depictions of prehistoric life to surrealist paintings. Kosemen's surrealist art combines elements of "imaginary spirits" and "mythological environments". In 2010, Kosemen met Kerimcan Güleryüz, head of an art exhibition project called the Empire Project, which prompted him to further explore symbolism in art. Kosemen remains affiliated with the Empire Project Gallery in Istanbul as an artist.

Since 2010, Kosemen's artwork has been the subject of several exhibitions in Istanbul, such as the exhibition "Sanctuary" which was held at the art space in the quarter Karaköy called Space Debris from January 19 to February 17 of 2018. Kosemen typically completes one large research book and two art exhibits every year. In addition to exhibitions in Turkey, Kosemen's art has also been displayed internationally in Italy, Austria, Montenegro, England and Israel.

Writing 
In 2012, Kosemen co-authored the book All Yesterdays with Australian paleoartist John Conway and British paleontologist Darren Naish. The book, which garnered wide attention and positive reviews, explores speculative ideas in paleoart, art reconstructing prehistoric animals. Conway and Kosemen began working on the book together after they realized that a vast majority of modern dinosaur artwork did not really portray dinosaurs as real animals, ignoring features such as various type of soft tissue (e.g. skin flaps, pouches, fat) that are unlikely to have survived through fossilization. Both All Yesterdays and Conways's, Naish's and Kosemen's later book Cryptozoologicon were widely featured in the media.

In 2011, Kosemen discovered that he is descended from Dönmeh, Jews forced to convert to Islam in the 17th century. He published a book about them, Osman Hasan and the Tombstone Photographs of the Dönmes, in 2014. This book was purchased by several leading research institutes and universities worldwide and won Kosemen the Eduard-Duckesz History Prize in 2016. 

Kosemen's 2018 book The Disappearing City, explores and collects photographs of 20th century Turkish street signs and architecture in Istanbul. Describing the book, Kosemen has stated that it came about since Istanbul is rapidly replacing its 20th century buildings and that the city as such is "losing some valuable buildings of a type that are being preserved in, say, Tel Aviv".

Kosemen has garnered attention for his work within the speculative evolution genre. In 2006, he published the book All Tomorrows online as a free PDF file. All Tomorrows explores a speculative billion-year future history of humanity and its descendants and experienced a surge in online popularity in 2021. Kosemen is also known for his "Snaiad" speculative evolution project, which explores a fictional alien world called Snaiad, with a diverse ecosystem of creatures designed by Kosemen himself. Kosemen hopes to eventually publish Snaiad as a book.

Tangent Realms 
A documentary about C. M. Kosemen and his work, titled Tangent Realms: The Worlds of C. M. Kösemen and directed by indie filmmaker Kevin Schreck, was released in 2018. The film explores not only Kosemen's art, but also his personal life and questions he and other people face at some point in their lives. The film received awards at several indie film festivals.

Bibliography

Speculative biology and paleontology 

 2006 All Tomorrows: A Billion Year Chronicle of the Myriad Species and Mixed Fortunes of Man
 2012 All Yesterdays: Unique and Speculative Views of Dinosaurs and Other Prehistoric Animals, with John Conway and Darren Naish
 2013 All Your Yesterdays: Extraordinary Visions of Extinct Life by a New Generation of Palaeoartists (free e-book)
 2013 Cryptozoologicon: The Biology, Evolution, and Mythology of Hidden Animals, with John Conway and Darren Naish

Culture and history in Turkey 

 2013 Nişanyan House, a Photographic Essay
 2014 Osman Hasan and the Tombstone Photographs of the Dönmes
 2018 The Bodrum Jewish Cemetery
 2018 The Disappearing City: Hand-Painted Apartment Signs and Architectural Details from 20th-Century Istanbul
 2018 A Karakaş Speaks: Interviews with a Member of Turkey’s Crypto-Judaic “Dönme” Sect
 2019 Memories and Stories of Bodrum's Jewish Community
 2019 Hatıratlarda Türkiye Yahudileri, with Rıfat N. Bali
 2020 Memoirs of an Istanbul Psychiatrist, translated and edited memoirs of Turkish neuropsychiatrist Henri Griladze
 2021 Forests of the Afterlife: Folk Art and Symbolism in Village Cemeteries of Turkey's Bodrum-Milas Peninsula

Art collections 

 2016 Tangent Worlds: From the Sketchbooks of C. M. Kosemen (free e-book)
 2019 Alternate Life: From the Online Sketchbooks of C. M. Kosemen (free e-book)
 2020 Decade: Surreal Artworks by C. M. Kosemen (free e-book)

References

External links 
 C. M. Kosemen's website
 C. M. Kosemen's youtube channel, featuring his own podcast
 Life on Snaiad. Website of Kosemen's "Snaiad" project
 Talk about Snaiad and designing alien lifeforms by Kosemen on YouTube
 Website for the film Tangent Realms

1984 births
People from Ankara
Living people
Paleoartists
Turkish artists
Turkish photographers
Sabancı University alumni
Cornell University alumni
Alumni of Goldsmiths, University of London
Turkish people of Jewish descent
Artists from Istanbul